The 2012–13 Maltese Premier League was the 98th season of the Maltese Premier League, the top-tier football league in Malta. It began in August 2012 and ended in May 2013. Valletta were the defending champions, having won their 21st title last season.

The Premier League consisted of two rounds. In the First Round, every team played each opponent twice, once "home" and once "away" (in actuality, the designation of home and away were purely arbitrary as most of the clubs did not have their own grounds), for a total of 22 games. The league was then split into two pools. Earned points were subsequently halved. Teams that finished in the positions 1–6 compete in the "Top Six" and teams that finished in positions 7–12 play in the "Play-Out".

Teams
Marsaxlokk were relegated to the First Division after finishing in last place of the Play-Out last season. This ended a three-year stay in the Premier League for them.

Promoted to the top flight were Rabat Ajax, who returned to the Premier League after an eleven-season absence, and Melita, who became the first amateur club to reach the Premier League as well as being the only amateur club in the world taking part in the top tier of a professional league.

Venues

Stadia and training grounds
Only a few stadia have the infrastructure needed to host Premier League matches. These are Ta' Qali National Stadium and Centenary Stadium at Ta' Qali, Victor Tedesco Stadium at Ħamrun and Hibernians Ground at Paola. Additional to that, each team has been assigned to a dedicated training ground. On a few occasions, Hibernians and Hamrun Spartans play at their home ground, but otherwise all games are played on neutral ground, rendering "home" and "away" games purely symbolic.

First phase

League table

Results

Second phase

Top Six

Play-Out

Championship play-off
Birkirkara and Hibernians finished the season level on points. A play-off decided the title.

Birkirkara qualified for the 2013–14 UEFA Champions League.
Hibernians qualified for the 2013–14 UEFA Europa League.

Season statistics

Top scorers

References

External links
 Premier League official page
 UEFA website

Maltese Premier League seasons
Malta
1